Porndemic is a 2018 documentary film about an HIV outbreak within the pornography industry in California's San Fernando Valley, during the 1990s. The film premiered on Showtime. It was directed by Brendan Spookie Daly and features interviews with several porn actors and actresses, including Tricia Devereaux, Ron Jeremy, and Marc Wallice.

See also

 HIV/AIDS in the United States
 STDs in the porn industry

References

External links
 Porndemic at Showtime
 

2018 television films
Documentary films about HIV/AIDS
Documentary films about sexuality
HIV/AIDS in American films
San Fernando Valley
Showtime (TV network) films
STDs in the sex industry
Pornography in California
2018 films
American documentary films
2010s American films